The Work Tour was the debut headlining theatre tour by English-Irish girl group The Saturdays. The tour became the group's first headlining tour, but second time touring (after touring with Girls Aloud in 2008 as a support act for their Tangled Up Tour). The tour opened on 2 June 2009, and lasted for 24 shows, finishing on 7 July 2009. The tour featured all of their songs from their debut album (apart from "Vulnerable"), a medley of covers, and two new songs that would feature on their then untitled, and up-coming second studio album Wordshaker.

Background
The tour was announced official by The Saturdays, to further promote their 2008 album Chasing Lights. The tour was named after the group's fifth single Work which release coincided with the tour. The fastest venue to completely sell out was the Brighton Dome.

Concert synopsis
The concert began with a video interlude, which saw the group members individually walk down the catwalk on the set of the work video, this was played to an instrumental version of the Wideboys Remix of their single Up. The intro to their debut single If This Is Love began, and one by one different coloured lights appeared on each girl in turn. This was followed by Set Me Off. Keep her was next to be performed, before the girls brought chairs on stage to sing the comic relief single Just Can't Get Enough. They then performed Wordshaker, which was then unheard, and was to feature on their then upcoming album of the same name.

A Motown version of "Why Me Why Now" followed before the girls had a costume change. An extended intro of fall began, before the girls returned to the stage to perform the song. This was followed by an acoustic cover of Madcon's song Beggin' which came before an acoustic version of Chasing Lights. A video Interlude, was then played showing their video flip highlights, before they returned to stage to perform a covers medley, which consisted of the songs; Shut Up And Drive by Rihanna, I Kissed A Girl by Katy Perry, and So What by Pink. One Shot, another song to appear on their second album, was performed next. Lies continued the show, which was then followed by the tour's title song, Work. Work had an extended outro, which made the show appear to have ended.

Next, writing appeared on the video screen, asking if the crowd wanted more, before a musical interlude began signalling the start of the encore segment of the show with a selection of clips from the 'Issues' video. The girls then returned to the stage to perform the song, before ending the show with Up, as they danced with umbrellas.

Support acts
 Pixie Lott
 Mini Viva
 Jessie Malakouti

Setlist
The Catwalk (Video Introduction) (Up Wideboys Remix Instrumental played by the band)
 costume: Black Anoraks
 If This Is Love
 costume: Silver Outfits
  Set Me Off
 Keep Her
 Just Can't Get Enough
 Wordshaker (Album track off Wordshaker)
 Why Me, Why Now? (Mowtown Remix)
Fall Extended Intro
 Costume: White Dresses
  Fall
 Beggin' (Acoustic version of Madcon single)
 Chasing Lights (Acoustic version)
Video Flips Montage (Video interlude)
 costume: Black Tops, Ripped Jeans
  Shut Up And Drive/I Kissed A Girl/So What
 One Shot (Album track off Wordshaker)
 Lies
 Work
Encore
 Glitter Outfits in Different Colours
  Issues
 Up

 Vanessa had a foot injury; she remained seated for part of the tour 
 At the final date of the tour, the group performed a short tribute to the late singer Michael Jackson after his death in June 2009, as they stated they had been watching the funeral service on TV before the show. McFly's Dougie Poynter joined the girls on stage, and played bass during "Just Can't Get Enough".

Tour dates

Broadcasts and recordings
None of the shows was filmed for a DVD or televised release/viewing. The only available footage is fan filmed videos uploaded on to YouTube. The group used the setlist from the Work Tour when they performed at the 2009 iTunes Festival, London. Six of the tracks (If This is Love, Just Can't Get Enough, Why Me, Why Now, Work, Issues and Up) featured on an EP released by the band called iTunes Live: London Festival '09. Three additional tracks (Chasing Lights, One Shot and Wordshaker) were iTunes bonus tracks for the band's second album, Wordshaker.

References

2009 concert tours
The Saturdays concert tours